Les Graulges (Limousin: Los Grauges) is a former commune in the Dordogne department in Nouvelle-Aquitaine in southwestern France. On 1 January 2017, it was merged into the new commune Mareuil en Périgord.

Geography
The Lizonne forms the commune's southern border. The Bretanges, a tributary of the Lizonne, forms part of the commune's southeastern border.

The village lies in the southern part of the commune, on a height above the Lizonne.

Population

See also
Communes of the Dordogne department

References

Former communes of Dordogne